Naikhongchhari is an upazila of Bandarban District in the Division of Chittagong, Bangladesh.

Geography
It has 6,882 households and a total area of 463.61 km2.

Demographics
As of the 1991 Bangladesh census, Naikhongchhari has a population of 38350. Males constitute 53.26% of the population, and females 46.74%. This Upazila's eighteen up population is 18754. Naikhongchhari has an average literacy rate of 20.2% (7+ years), and the national average of 32.4% literate.

Administration
Naikhongchhari Upazila is divided into four union parishads: Baishari, Dochhari, Ghandung, and Naikhongchhari. The union parishads are subdivided into 17 mauzas and 237 villages.

Nutrient Composition of Feed Stuffs
Nutrient Composition of Feed Stuffs

Division: Chottogram

Upazilla: Naikhangchori

See also
Upazilas of Bangladesh
Districts of Bangladesh
Divisions of Bangladesh

References

Naikhangchori Composition of Feed Stuffs | https://www.blrifeed.com/index.php?title=Naikhongchhari_Upazila

Upazilas of Bandarban District